The 2005 Big Ten Conference baseball tournament was held at Illinois Field on the campus of the University of Illinois at Urbana–Champaign in Champaign, Illinois, from May 15 through 19. The top six teams from the regular season participated in the double-elimination tournament, the twenty fourth annual tournament sponsored by the Big Ten Conference to determine the league champion.  won their seventh tournament championship and earned the Big Ten Conference's automatic bid to the 2005 NCAA Division I baseball tournament.

Format and seeding 
The 2005 tournament was a 6-team double-elimination tournament, with seeds determined by conference regular season winning percentage only. Michigan claimed the fourth seed over Ohio State by tiebreaker. As in the previous three years, the top two seeds received a single bye, with the four lower seeds playing opening round games. The top seed played the lowest seeded winner from the opening round, with the second seed playing the higher seed. Teams that lost in the opening round played an elimination game.

Tournament 

* - Indicates game required 13 innings.
† - Indicates game required 11 innings.

All-Tournament Team 
The following players were named to the All-Tournament Team.

Most Outstanding Player 
Steve Caravati was named Most Outstanding Player. Caravati was an outfielder for Ohio State.

References 

Tournament
Big Ten baseball tournament
Big Ten Baseball Tournament
Big Ten baseball tournament